James M. McIntyre (January 21, 1918 – October 8, 1991) was a former Democratic member of the Pennsylvania House of Representatives.

References

Democratic Party members of the Pennsylvania House of Representatives
1918 births
1991 deaths
20th-century American politicians